Schochia Brunner von Wattenwyl, 1895, is an extant genus of South American bush-cricket (Orthoptera: Tettigoniidae) in the subfamily Pseudophyllinae.

Species
Schochia laevis Brunner von Wattenwyl, 1895
Schochia veta Piza, 1958
Schochia viridis Beier, 1954

References

Tettigoniidae genera
Pseudophyllinae